The 2018–19 Serbian SuperLiga was the thirteenth season of the Serbian SuperLiga since its establishment. Red Star was the defending champions from the previous season.

Teams

The league consisted of 16 teams: fourteen teams from the 2017–18 Serbian SuperLiga and two new teams from the 2017–18 Serbian First League.

Teams promoted to the SuperLiga

The first club to be promoted was Proleter Novi Sad, following their 3–1 win against Radnički 1923 on 20 May 2018. Proleter will play in the Serbian SuperLiga for the first time in their history. It will also be first time ever that two teams from Novi Sad are members of top flight.

The second club to be promoted was Dinamo Vranje, following their 1–1 draw with Novi Pazar on 26 May 2018. Dinamo will play in the Serbian SuperLiga for the first time in their history.

Teams relegated to the First League

The first club to be relegated was Borac Čačak, who were relegated on 5 May 2018 following a 2–1 defeat against Rad, ending their 4-year stay in the top flight.

The second and final club to be relegated was Javor Ivanjica, who were relegated on 17 May 2018 following their 1–1 draw with Rad, ending their 3-year stay in the top flight.

Venues

Personnel and kits

Note: Flags indicate national team as has been defined under FIFA eligibility rules. Players and Managers may hold more than one non-FIFA nationality.

Nike is the official ball supplier for Serbian SuperLiga.

Transfers
For the list of transfers involving SuperLiga clubs during 2018–19 season, please see: List of Serbian football transfers summer 2018.

Regular season

League table

Results

Play-offs

Championship round
The top eight teams advanced from the regular season. Points from the regular season were halved with half points rounded up. Teams played each other once.

League table

Results

Relegation round
The bottom eight teams from the regular season play in the relegation round. Points from the regular season are halved with half points rounded up. Teams play each other once.

League table

Results

Relegations play-off
Two legged relegation play-off match will be played between team placed 14th at the end of relegation round and winner of Serbian First League promotion play-off.

Individual statistics

Top goalscorers
As of matches played on 19 May 2019.

1 Vukanović has played for Napredak until matchday 21 and scored 12 goals.

Hat-tricks

Top assists
As of matches played on 11 May 2019.

Player of the week
As of matches played on 20 May 2019.

Awards

Team of the Season

Player of the season 
 Marko Marin (Red Star)

Coach of the season
 Vladan Milojević (Red Star)

References

External links
 
 UEFA

Serbia
Serbian SuperLiga seasons
2018–19 in Serbian football leagues